Grindheim Church is a parish church of the Church of Norway in Lyngdal Municipality in Agder county, Norway. It is located in the village of Grindheim. It is the church for the Grindheim parish which is part of the Lister og Mandal prosti (deanery) in the Diocese of Agder og Telemark. The white, wooden church was built in a cruciform design in 1783 using plans drawn up by an unknown architect. The church seats about 250 people.

History
The earliest existing historical records of the church date back to the year 1425, but the church was not new that year. The old medieval church was torn down in 1783 and replaced with a new building on the same site. In 1791, the church interior was decorated with rosemåling by Tore Asbjørnson Risøyne. In 1898, the decorations were painted over, because it was felt that the congregation spent too much time looking at them during services. In 1941, the decorations were uncovered as part of a major restoration project.

See also
List of churches in Agder og Telemark

References

Lyngdal
Churches in Agder
Wooden churches in Norway
Cruciform churches in Norway
18th-century Church of Norway church buildings
Churches completed in 1783
14th-century establishments in Norway